is a rural district in Iwate Prefecture, in the Tōhoku region of northern Japan.

History
During the Edo period under the Tokugawa shogunate, the district was within Mutsu Province and was under the control of the Date clan of the Sendai Domain. In 1869, following the Meiji restoration, Mutsu Province was divided, with the area of Kesen District becoming part of Rikuchū Province, and from 1872, part of Iwate Prefecture.

On April 1, 1889, with the establishment of the municipalities system, the district was organized into two towns (Sakari and Takata) and 20 villages.

Subsequent timeline
 November 1, 1926 - The village of Kesen elevated to town status (3 towns, 19 villages)
 April 1, 1932 - The village of Ōfunato raised to town status.  (4 towns, 18 villages)
 April 29, 1940 - The village of Setamai raised to town status.  (5 towns, 17 villages)
 April 1, 1952 - The towns of Ōfunato and Sakari and the villages of Akasaki, Ikawa, Takkon, Hikoroichi and Massaki merge to form the city of Ōfunato. (3 towns, 12 villages)
 June 1, 1952 - The village of Hirota raised to town status. (4 towns, 11 villages)
 January 1, 1955 – The towns of Takata, Kesen and Hirota and the villages of Otomo, Takekoma, Yasaki, Yokota, and Yonesaki merged to form the city of Rikuzentakata. (1 town, 6 villages)
 April 1, 1955 - The town of Setamai and the villages of Shimoarisu and Kamiarisu merged to form the town of Sumita (1 town, 4 villages)
 April 1, 1955 - The village of Tōni annexed by the city of Kamaishi. (1 town, 3 villages)
 September 30, 1956 - The villages of Okirai, Yoshihama, and Ryōri merged to form the village of Sanriku. (1 town, 1 village)
April 1, 1967 – The village of Sanriku raised to town status (2 towns)
 November 15, 2001: The town of Sanriku is annexed by the city of Ōfunato. (1 town)

Districts in Iwate Prefecture